WorldEnd, short for , also known as SukaSuka, is a Japanese light novel series written by Akira Kareno and illustrated by Ue. The series' first volume was published by Kadokawa Shoten under their Sneaker Bunko imprint on November 1, 2014, with the series ending with the release of the fifth volume in April 2016. A sequel series titled , also known as SukaMoka, began publication with the release of the first volume in April 2016.

Plot
It has been over 500 years since the human race almost went extinct at the hands of the fearsome and mysterious "Beasts". The surviving races now make their homes, towns, and cities up on floating islands in the sky to keep out of reach of all but the most mobile of Beasts. Only a group of young girls, dubbed the Leprechauns, can wield the ancient Dug Weapons needed to fend off invasions from those dangerous creatures. Into the people's unstable and fleeting lives, where a simple call to certain death could come at any moment, enters an unlikely character: a mysterious man who lost everything in his final battle five hundred years ago, and had awakened from a long, icy slumber. Unable to fight any longer, the man, Willem, becomes the father those kids never had, caring for and nurturing them even as he struggles to come to terms with his new life, in which he feels the pain of helplessly waiting for his loved ones to return home from battle that his 'Daughter' once felt for him so long ago. Together, Willem and the leprechauns gradually come to understand what family means and what is truly worth protecting in their lives.

Characters

Willem is the main protagonist and only "alive" emnetwihts ('human'; from Anglo-Saxon) being in a world where humans have been driven to extinction by creations they call "Beasts". Known as the Black Agate Swordmaster, he is later found under a frozen lake after being cursed to petrifaction for five hundred years by the poteau Ebon Candle. He continues his fight against the Beasts, this time as the adviser to the "Fairies," since his body is too damaged to wield a Weapon after his battle with Eboncandle. As an active fighter he once wielded Percival, a mass produced version of the Dug Weapons (once called Carillons).

Chtholly is one of the Leprechauns (lit. 'golden fairy') who can use Weapons. She inherited the Weapon Seniorious, which once belonged to Lillia, a brave from Willem's past. She develops feelings for Willem when she meets him for the first time.

Ithea is a Leprechaun that has her hair styled like cat ears. She has a happy-go-lucky personality, and often jokes that Willem only likes girls of her age; but she hides her true identity. She is the wielder of the Dug Weapon called Valgulious.

Nephren is a Leprechaun rarely showing emotions. She cares for Willem and helps him a lot but often sticks to him for some unknown reason. She loves flowers. She is the wielder of the Dug Weapon called Insania.

A Leprechaun wielding the Dug Weapon Historia. She loves to read poems and speaks in a poetic tone.

A Leprechaun wielding the Dug Weapon Desperatio. She loves meat, and shows brutality when killing Beasts.

A young, battle-ready Leprechaun, but never paired with a Dug Weapon. She is a fan of romantic movies.

A Leprechaun, always ready for a fight. She attacked Willem while he is on his way to the warehouse to report for duty with a wooden sword.

A clumsy and shy Leprechaun kid who is often seen with Tiat, Collon, and Pannibal.

An energetic Leprechaun who always speaks with exclamations.

A Leprechaun who fell in a ravine but remained indifferent to her injuries, which made Willem question his true mission in the Warehouse and Facility.

A Troll ( 'man-eating demon'), she lusts after Willem's flesh, but represses it. In the same way that Willem represents the military, she represents the Guild in securing the Facility. She knows Willem well because she led the expedition that found him in a petrified state.

A goblin ( 'green demon') who works as a salvager for artifacts on The Surface (the land below the sky islands where the Beasts are), a risky job. He wants Willem to join the Army. He was with Rhan and Nopht on the surface on an artifact recovery mission.

A Reptilian officer. Willem refers to him as "The Lizard."

Willem's last mention before he became petrified, probably one of the children he cared for.

She is the Lycanthrope daughter of the mayor of the sky island city named Corna di Luce who asks Limeskin, who, in turn, asks Willem, to help against a group of activists, but due to his connections with the military, they cannot intervene in political matters, and since Willem is "busy with babysitting."

A high ranking brave from Willem's past who once wielded Seniorious.

Willem's former partner from 500 years ago. He died after a suicide attack and became an barrowwiht, enabling Willem to disable a Poteau ('earthly deity') named Eboncandle. Before his death he cursed himself, altering his life force in the process, stripping him of his humanity but gifting him with immortality. In this new state he will not die of injury or age. He has a deep fascination over white capes, naming him Great Sage by Eboncandle and Willem. Souwong, later working together with the powerful beast Eboncandle, created the Sky Archipelago of floating islands over 500 years ago to protect the remaining survivors from the beasts lurking on The Surface.

She is Visitor ('star deity') who are said to have created the world, but has the appearance of a young girl.

Media

Light novels
The light novel series is written by Akira Kareno with illustrations by Ue, the first volume was published on November 1, 2014, under Kadokawa Sneaker Bunko imprint and the fifth and last volume was released on April 1, 2016. A side story was released on February 1, 2017. The sequel series started with the first volume released on April 1, 2016 (the same day the last original series volume was released), and the eleventh and last volume was published on July 30, 2021. A two-volume side story, Leila Asprey, was released in 2019 and 2020.

During their panel at Anime NYC 2017, Yen Press announced that they have licensed the light novel.

SukaSuka

SukaMoka

Sukasuka Side Story: Leila Asprey

Manga
Kaname Seu launched a manga adaptation of the series in Kadokawa's seinen manga magazine Monthly Comic Alive on June 27, 2016. The manga ended on May 26, 2018.

Anime
An anime adaptation of WorldEnd was announced with the release of the second volume of SukaMoka. The anime adaptation was revealed as a television series that would premiere in April 2017. The series was directed by Jun'ichi Wada at studios Satelight and C2C, with scripts written by series creator Akira Kareno, Mariko Mochizuki, Shingo Nagai and Toshizo Nemoto, and music composed by Tatsuya Kato.

The opening theme is "DEAREST DROP" sung by Azusa Tadokoro. The ending theme is "From" by TRUE, Kinema by TRUE in episode 6 and Ever be my love by Tamaru Yamada in episode 12. Additionally, "Scarborough Fair" and "Always in My Heart" by Tamaru Yamada were played in episodes 1 and 12, as well as "I Call You" (In the released music collection, the name of this song was changed to "Call you")  by Tamaru Yamada in episode 9.

The anime aired on April 11, 2017, on Tokyo MX, with further broadcasts on TV Aichi, Sun TV, TVQ Kyushu Broadcasting, BS11, and AT-X then finished on June 27, 2017. The series ran for 12 episodes. The series is licensed in North America by Crunchyroll, and Funimation released it on home video with an English dub. Following Sony's acquisition of Crunchyroll, the dub was moved to Crunchyroll. Muse Communication licensed the series in South and Southeast Asia and streamed it on their YouTube channel.

Notes

References

External links
 Sukasuka at Sneaker Bunko 
  
 

2014 Japanese novels
2016 Japanese novels
2017 anime television series debuts
Anime and manga based on light novels
C2C (studio)
Crunchyroll anime
Kadokawa Dwango franchises
Kadokawa Sneaker Bunko
Light novels
Media Factory manga
Muse Communication
Satelight
Seinen manga
Tokyo MX original programming
Yen Press titles